Jón Gunnarsson (born 21 September 1956 in Reykjavík) is an Icelandic politician who has been the minister of justice of Iceland since 1 February 2022. He served as minister of the interior from 2021 to 2022 and as minister of transport and local government in 2017.

References

External links 
 Non auto-biography of Jón Gunnarsson on the parliament website

1956 births
Living people
Interior ministers of Iceland
Justice ministers of Iceland
Members of the Althing
Politicians from Reykjavík